Varastatud kohtumine (Stolen Meeting) is a 1989 Estonian drama film directed by Leida Laius.

Plot
Valentina Saar (Maria Klenskaja) has led a troubled life. She knows little about her parents and grew up in an orphanage. After becoming pregnant, she abandons the baby and later ends up in prison. After she is released from prison and returns to Estonia, she begins searching for her young son Jüri (Andreas Kangur). Jüri has also spent his early years in an orphanage and is now living with foster parents Tiina and Ilmar Kuusberg (Kaie Mihkelson and Lembit Peterson), a well-to-do couple living in Tartu. Valentina now believes her life will change for the better once she regains custody of Jüri. When she finally finds her son in Tartu, Valentina has to evaluate both her and Jüri's lives and decide what is in the best interest for Jüri.

Cast
Maria Klenskaja as Valentina Saar
Andreas Kangur as Jüri Saar-Kuusberg
Kaie Mihkelson as Tiina Kuusberg, Jüri's stepmother
Lembit Peterson as Ilmar Kuusberg, Jüri's stepfather
Terje Pennie as Milvi
Sulev Luik as Valter Uibo
Hilja Varem as Johanna Uibo, Valter's mother
Ita Ever as Doctor Aimla
Ninel Järvson as Anna Andrejevna
Carmen Uibokant as Sirje
Mihkel Smeljanski as Udo Tamm
Siiri Sisask as Sirje's friend
Ada Lundver as Inspector
Vladimir Laptev as Commandant
Igor Ivanov as Roman
Paul Poom as Lembit
Mari Lill as Asta
Leida Rammo as Marta Toomingas
Hannes Kaljujärv as Marta's son

Awards
 1989: Women in Film (Los Angeles, USA), Grand prix Lilian Gish award to Leida Laius
 1989: All-Union Actors Festival (Kalinin, USSR), best actress: Maria Klenskaja
 1990: Festival of Female Film Directors (Venice, Italy), best film

References

External links
 
 Varastatud kohtumine, entry in Estonian Film Database (EFIS)

1989 films
Estonian drama films
Estonian-language films